Tiger by the Tail may refer to:

Books
 "Tiger by the Tail" (short story), a 1961 science fiction short story by Alan E. Nourse
 Medusa: A Tiger by the Tail, a 1983 science fiction novel by Jack L. Chalker
 Tiger by the Tail (Chase novel), a 1954 thriller novel by James Hadley Chase
 Tiger by the Tail (Coelho novel), a 2013 novel by Indian author Venita Coelho

Film and TV
 Tiger by the Tail (1955 film), a British crime film directed by John Gilling and starring Larry Parks, Constance Smith and Donald Stewart
 Tiger by the Tail (1970 film), an American crime film starring Christopher George and Tippi Hedren

See also
 "I've Got a Tiger By the Tail," a 1964 country-western song by Buck Owens